Usanovka is a rural locality (a settlement) in Zakamensky District, Republic of Buryatia, Russia. The population was 53 as of 2010.

Geography 
Usanovka is located 56 km east of Zakamensk (the district's administrative centre) by road. Khamney is the nearest rural locality.

References 

Rural localities in Zakamensky District